Pietro Bianchi (September 1694 – 2 September 1740) was an Italian painter of the Baroque period, active in Genoa and Rome.

Biography
Pietro's father, Giovanni Bianchi, had moved from Sarzana to Rome in 1682. His sister was married to an attendant to the household of the Marchese Marcello Sacchetti, who noted the boy Pietro's affinity for drawing. As a boy he was placed in the apprenticeship of a painter J. Triga, but then passed on to work in the school of the Genoese Giovanni Battista Gaulli. In 1707, at age 13, he won a drawing competition sponsored by the Accademia di San Luca. In 1709, when Gaulli died, and he entered the studio of Giuseppe Ghezzi then under Benedetto Luti. He painted both religious stories and still life pictures of animals, flowers, and fruits.

He painted a St. Clara at Gubbio, and a picture of the Conception for the church of Santa Maria degli Angeli at Rome, of which a mosaic copy is in a chapel of St. Peter's Basilica.

Bianchi died at 46 years of age. Gaetano Sardi was one of his pupils. Giovanni Frossi was another pupil.

References

1694 births
1740 deaths
17th-century Italian painters
Italian male painters
18th-century Italian painters
Italian Baroque painters
Italian still life painters
18th-century Italian male artists